The 2004 Cleveland Indians season was the 104th season for the franchise.

Offseason
November 13, 2003: Jason Bere was signed as a free agent with the Cleveland Indians.
December 1, 2003: Ernie Young was signed as a free agent with the Cleveland Indians.
January 21, 2004: Jeff D'Amico was signed as a free agent with the Cleveland Indians.

Regular season

Season standings

Record vs. opponents

Notable transactions
April 3, 2004: Milton Bradley was traded by the Cleveland Indians to the Los Angeles Dodgers for a player to be named later and Franklin Gutierrez. The Los Angeles Dodgers sent Andrew Brown (May 19, 2004) to the Cleveland Indians to complete the trade.
April 25, 2004: Russell Branyan was traded by the Atlanta Braves to the Cleveland Indians for Scott Sturkie (minors).
June 30, 2004: Jeff D'Amico was released by the Cleveland Indians.
July 26, 2004: Russell Branyan was sent to the Milwaukee Brewers by the Cleveland Indians as part of a conditional deal.

Roster

Game log

|- bgcolor="#ffbbbb"
| 51 || June 3 || @ Angels || 2–5 || Escobar (4–2) || Lee (5–1) || || Angel Stadium of Anaheim || 39,353 || 22–29 || L3
|- bgcolor="#bbffbb"
| 52 || June 4 || @ Angels || 9–6 || Riske (2–2) || Rodríguez (1–1) || Jiménez (2) || Angel Stadium of Anaheim || 43,590 || 23–29 || W1
|- bgcolor="#bbffbb"
| 53 || June 5 || @ Angels || 3–2 || White (3–1) || Lackey (3–7) || Jiménez (3) || Angel Stadium of Anaheim || 43,514 || 24–29 || W2
|- bgcolor="#bbffbb"
| 54 || June 6 || @ Angels || 7–0 || Sabathia (3–3) || Colón (4–4) || || Angel Stadium of Anaheim || 43,337 || 25–29 || W3
|- bgcolor="#bbffbb"
| 65 || June 18 || @ Braves || 4–2 || Lee (6–1) || Hampton (1–7) || Jiménez (6) || Turner Field || 28,000 || 32–33 || W1
|- bgcolor="#ffbbbb"
| 66 || June 19 || @ Braves || 0–4 || Byrd (1–0) || Westbrook (6–3) || Smoltz (11) || Turner Field || 41,987 || 32–34 || L1
|- bgcolor="#bbffbb"
| 67 || June 20 || @ Braves || 5–2 || Davis (2–5) || Ortiz (6–6) || Jiménez (7) || Turner Field || 31,000 || 33–34 || W1
|-

|- bgcolor="#bbffbb"
| 92 || July 19 || @ Angels || 8–5 (10) || Riske (5–2) || Percival (2–2) || Miller (1) || Angel Stadium of Anaheim || 42,986 || 45–47 || W1
|- bgcolor="#bbffbb"
| 93 || July 20 || @ Angels || 14–5 || Westbrook (7–5) || Washburn (10–5) || || Angel Stadium of Anaheim || 40,000 || 46–47 || W2
|-

|- bgcolor="#ffbbbb"
| 136 || September 3 || Angels || 5–10 || Escobar (9–9) || Elarton (3–4) || || Jacobs Field || 20,994 || 67–69 || L3
|- bgcolor="#ffbbbb"
| 137 || September 4 || Angels || 1–6 || Washburn (11–5) || Davis (2–7) || || Jacobs Field || 23,786 || 67–70 || L4
|- bgcolor="#ffbbbb"
| 138 || September 5 || Angels || 1–2 || Lackey (12–11) || Westbrook (12–7) || Rodríguez (11) || Jacobs Field || 26,208 || 67–71 || L5
|-

|- style="text-align:center;"
| Legend:       = Win       = Loss       = PostponementBold = Indians team member

|-align="center" bgcolor="#ffbbbb"  
| 1 || April 5 || @ Twins || 7 – 4 (11) || Rincón (1-0) || Durbin (0-1) || || 49,584 || 0-1
|-align="center" bgcolor="#ffbbbb"  
| 2 || April 6 || @ Twins || 7 – 6 (15) || Roa (1-0) || Westbrook (0-1) || || 19,832 || 0-2
|-align="center" bgcolor="#bbffbb"
| 3 || April 7 || @ Twins || 11 – 4 || Durbin (1-1) || Lohse (0-1) || || 20,313 || 1-2
|-align="center" bgcolor="#bbffbb"
| 4 || April 8 || @ Royals || 6 – 1 || D'Amico (1-0) || Affeldt (0-1) || || 14,671 || 2-2
|-align="center" bgcolor="#ffbbbb" 
| 5 || April 9 || @ Royals || 3 – 1 || Grimsley (1-0) || Cressend (0-1) || Leskanic (1) || 28,535 || 2-3
|-align="center" bgcolor="#ffbbbb" 
| 6 || April 10 || @ Royals || 7 – 6 (10) || Sullivan (1-0) || Betancourt (0-1) || || 21,889 || 2-4
|-align="center" bgcolor="#ffbbbb" 
| 7 || April 11 || @ Royals || 5 – 3 || Sullivan (2-0) || Jiménez (0-1) || Leskanic (2) || 16,933 || 2-5
|-align="center" bgcolor="#bbffbb"
| 8 || April 12 || Twins || 6 – 3 || Lee (1-0) || Lohse (0-2) || || 42,424 || 3-5
|-align="center" bgcolor="#ffbbbb" 
| 9 || April 14 || Twins || 10 – 6 || Silva (1-0) || D'Amico (1-1) || Rincón (1) || 14,237 || 3-6
|-align="center" bgcolor="#ffbbbb" 
| 10 || April 15 || Twins || 3 – 0 || Radke (2-0) || Stanford (0-1) || Nathan (1) || 15,105 || 3-7
|-align="center" bgcolor="#bbffbb"
| 11 || April 16 || Tigers || 10 – 3 || Sabathia (1-0) || Cornejo (1-1) || || 18,507 || 4-7
|-align="center" bgcolor="#ffbbbb"
| 12 || April 17 || Tigers || 6 – 1 || Maroth (2-0) || Davis (0-1) || || 18,955 || 4-8
|-align="center" bgcolor="#bbffbb"
| 13 || April 18 || Tigers || 9 – 7 || Lee (2-0) || Bonderman (1-1) || Riske (1) || 19,240 || 5-8
|-align="center" bgcolor="#ffbbbb"
| 14 || April 19 || Tigers || 10 – 4 || Levine (1-0) || Betancourt (0-2) || || 13,650 || 5-9
|-align="center" bgcolor="#ffbbbb"
| 15 || April 20 || Royals || 15 – 5 || Anderson (1-0) || Durbin (1-2) || || 13,563 || 5-10
|-align="center" bgcolor="#bbbbbb"
| -- || April 21 ||  Royals || colspan=6|Postponed (rain) Rescheduled for July 24
|-align="center" bgcolor="#bbffbb"
| 16 || April 22 || Royals || 5 – 4 || Betancourt (1-2) || Grimsley (1-1) || Riske (2) || 15,720 || 6-10
|-align="center" bgcolor="#ffbbbb"
| 17 || April 23 || @ Tigers || 17 – 3 || Bonderman (2-1) || Davis (0-2) || || 22,008 || 6-11
|-align="center" bgcolor="#ffbbbb"
| 18 || April 24 || @ Tigers || 5 – 2 || Urbina (1-0) || Stewart (0-1) || || 20,913 || 6-12
|-align="center" bgcolor="#bbffbb"
| 19 || April 25 || @ Tigers || 3 – 2 || Westbrook (1-1) || Johnson (1-4) || ||17,253 || 7-12
|-align="center" bgcolor="#bbffbb"
| 20 || April 27 || @ White Sox || 11 – 7 (10) || Betancourt (2-2) || Adkins (2-1) || || 14,572 || 8-12
|-align="center" bgcolor="#ffbbbb"
| 21 || April 28 || @ White Sox || 9 – 8 || Jackson (1-0) || Betancourt (2-3) || || 12,189 || 8-13
|-align="center" bgcolor="#bbffbb"
| 22 || April 30 || Orioles || 11 – 2 || Lee (3-0) || Ponson (2-2) || || 18,782 || 9-13
|-

|-align="center" bgcolor="#bbffbb"
| 23 || May 1 || Orioles || 3 – 2(13) || Durbin (2-2) || DeJean (0-2) || || 17,275 || 10-13
|-align="center" bgcolor="#bbbbbb"
| -- || May 2 ||  Orioles || colspan=6|Postponed (rain) Rescheduled for June 14
|-align="center" bgcolor="#bbffbb"
| 24 || May 3 || Red Sox || 2 – 1 || Westbrook (2-1) || Schilling (3-2) || Betancourt (1) || 16,285 || 11-13
|-align="center" bgcolor="#bbffbb"
| 25 || May 4 || Red Sox || 7 – 6 || Davis (1-2) || Lowe (3-2) || Betancourt (2) || 16,070 || 12-13
|-align="center" bgcolor="#ffbbbb"
| 26 || May 5 || Red Sox || 9 – 5 || Arroyo (1-1) || D'Amico (1-2) || || 17,370 || 12-14
|-align="center" bgcolor="#ffbbbb"
| 27 || May 6 || Red Sox || 5 – 2 || Martínez (4-2) || Sabathia (1-1) || Foulke (6) || 26,825 || 12-15
|-align="center" bgcolor="#ffbbbb"
| 28 || May 7 || @ Orioles || 3 – 2 (10) || Julio (1-0) || Durbin (2-3) || || 34,324 || 12-16
|-align="center" bgcolor="#ffbbbb"
| 29 || May 8 || @ Orioles || 10 – 7 || Parrish (3-1) || Stewart (0-2) || Julio (4) || 30,687 || 12-17
|-align="center" bgcolor="#ffbbbb"
| 30 || May 9 || @ Orioles || 12 – 11 || López (3-1) || Riske (0-1) || Julio (5) || 35,778 || 12-18
|-align="center" bgcolor="#bbffbb"
| 31 || May 10 || @ Red Sox || 10 – 6 || Durbin (3-3) || Kim (1-1) || ||35,257 || 13-18
|-align="center" bgcolor="#ffbbbb"
| 32 || May 11 || @ Red Sox || 5 – 3 || Embree (1-0) || Jiménez (0-2) || Foulke (7) || 35,401 || 13-19
|-align="center" bgcolor="#bbffbb"
| 33 || May 12 || @ Red Sox || 6 – 4 || Lee (4-0) || Wakefield (2-2) || || 35,371 || 14-19
|-align="center" bgcolor="#bbffbb"
| 34 || May 14 || Devil Rays || 8 – 7 (10) || White (1-0) || Carter (1-2) || || 19,796 || 15-19
|-align="center" bgcolor="#bbffbb"
| 35 || May 15 || Devil Rays || 9 – 7 || Westbrook (3-1) || Zambrano (3-4) || || 18,040 || 16-19
|-align="center" bgcolor="#bbffbb"
| 36 || May 16 || Devil Rays || 10 – 0 || Sabathia (2-1) || Waechter (1-4) || || 19,499 || 17-19
|-align="center" bgcolor="#bbffbb"
| 37 || May 17 || White Sox || 7 – 2 || Lee (5-0) || Díaz (0-1) || || 15,617 || 18-19
|-align="center" bgcolor="#ffbbbb"
| 38 || May 18 || White Sox || 4 – 2 || Garland (3-2) || Durbin (3-4) || Koch (7) || 15,298 || 18-20
|-align="center" bgcolor="#ffbbbb"
| 39 || May 19 || White Sox || 15 – 3 || Schoeneweis (4-1) || Davis (1-3) || || 17,205 || 18-21
|-align="center" bgcolor="#ffbbbb"
| 40 || May 21 || @ Devil Rays || 5 – 3 || Miller (1-1) || Sabathia (2-2) || Báez (6) || 10,213 || 18-22
|-align="center" bgcolor="#ffbbbb"
| 41 || May 22 || @ Devil Rays || 6 – 3 || Waechter (2-4) || Westbrook (3-2) || Sosa (1) || 12,008 || 18-23
|-align="center" bgcolor="#ffbbbb"
| 42 || May 23 || @ Devil Rays || 5 – 4 (10) || Harper (1-0) || Riske (0-2) || || 10,555 || 18-24
|-align="center" bgcolor="#ffbbbb"
| 43 || May 25 || Mariners || 5 – 4 (12) || Myers (2-1) || Jiménez (0-3) || Guardado (7) || 15,349 || 18-25
|-align="center" bgcolor="#ffbbbb"
| 44 || May 26 || Mariners || 7 – 3 || Moyer (3-2) || Sabathia (2-3) || Guardado (8) || 16,007 || 18-26
|-align="center" bgcolor="#bbffbb"
| 45 || May 27 || Mariners || 9 – 5 || Westbrook (4-2) || Meche (1-5) || || 17,272 || 19-26
|-align="center" bgcolor="#bbffbb"
| 46 || May 28 || Athletics || 1 – 0 || Jiménez (1-3) || Mecir (0-4) || || 19,257 || 20-26
|-align="center" bgcolor="#bbffbb"
| 47 || May 29 || Athletics || 8 – 6 || Riske (1-2) || Rhodes (1-2) || Jiménez (1) || 26,441 || 21-26
|-align="center" bgcolor="#bbffbb"
| 48 || May 30 || Athletics || 4 – 3 || White (2-0) || Rhodes (1-3) || || 24,005 || 22-26
|-

|-align="center" bgcolor="#ffbbbb"
| 49 || June 1 || Rangers || 6 – 5 (12) || Ramirez (3-2) || White (2-1) || Cordero (17) || 17,136 || 22-27
|-align="center" bgcolor="#ffbbbb"
| 50 || June 2 || Rangers || 5 – 3 || Almanzar (5-0) || Betancourt (2-4) || Cordero (18) || 18,098 || 22-28
|-align="center" bgcolor="#ffbbbb"
| 51 || June 3 || @ Angels || 5 – 2 || Escobar (4-2) || Lee (5-1) || || 39,353 || 22-29
|-align="center" bgcolor="#bbffbb"
| 52 || June 4 || @ Angels || 9 – 6 || Riske (2-2) || Rodríguez (1-1) || Jiménez (2) || 43,590 || 23-29
|-align="center" bgcolor="#bbffbb"
| 53 || June 5 || @ Angels || 3 – 2 || White (3-1) || Lackey (3-7) || Jiménez (3) || 43,514 ||  24-29
|-align="center" bgcolor="#bbffbb"
| 54 || June 6 || @ Angels || 7 – 0 || Sabathia (3-3) || Colón (4-4) || || 43,337 || 25-29
|-align="center" bgcolor="#ffbbbb"
| 55 || June 8 || Marlins || 7 – 5 || Bump (1-3) || Jiménez (1-4) || Benítez (23) || 21,252 || 25-30
|-align="center" bgcolor="#bbffbb"
| 56 || June 9 || Marlins || 8 – 1 || Westbrook (5-2) || Burnett (0-2) || || 17,072 || 26-30
|-align="center" bgcolor="#ffbbbb"
| 57 || June 10 || Marlins || 4 – 1 || Pavano (6-2) || Davis (1-4) || Benítez (24) || 19,113 || 26-31
|-align="center" bgcolor="#bbffbb"
| 58 || June 11 || Reds || 6 – 5 (11) || Riske (3-2) || Norton (0-1) || || 27,308 || 27-31
|-align="center" bgcolor="#bbffbb"
| 59 || June 12 || Reds || 8 – 7 || Betancourt (3-4) || Norton (0-2) || Jiménez (4) || 42,101 || 28-31
|-align="center" bgcolor="#bbffbb"
| 60 || June 13 || Reds || 10 – 8 || Miller (1-0) || Reith (2-2) || Jiménez (5) || 31,235 || 29-31
|-align="center" bgcolor="#bbffbb"
| 61 || June 14 || Orioles || 14 – 0 || Westbrook (6-2) || DuBose (4-5) || || 19,340 || 30-31
|-align="center" bgcolor="#ffbbbb"
| 62 || June 15 || @ Mets || 7 – 2 || Trachsel (6-5) || Davis (1-5) || || 22,783 || 30-32
|-align="center" bgcolor="#bbffbb"
| 63 || June 16 || @ Mets || 9 – 1 || Sabathia (4-3) || Ginter (1-1) || || 29,512 || 31-32
|-align="center" bgcolor="#ffbbbb"
| 64 || June 17 || @ Mets || 6 – 2 || Bottalico (3-1) || White (3-2) || || 17,675 || 31-33
|-align="center" bgcolor="#bbffbb"
| 65 || June 18 || @ Braves || 4 – 2 || Lee (6-1) || Hampton (1-7) || Jiménez (6) || 28,000 || 32-33
|-align="center" bgcolor="#ffbbbb"
| 66 || June 19 || @ Braves || 4 – 0 || Byrd (1-0) || Westbrook (6-3) || Smoltz (11) || 41,987 || 32-34
|-align="center" bgcolor="#bbffbb"
| 67 || June 20 || @ Braves || 5 – 2 || Davis (2-5) || Ortiz (6-6) || Jiménez (7) || 31,000 || 33-34
|-align="center" bgcolor="#bbffbb"
| 68 || June 21 || @ White Sox || 5 – 1 || Sabathia (5-3) || Schoeneweis (5-6) || || 29,722 || 34-34
|-align="center" bgcolor="#ffbbbb"
| 69 || June 22 || @ White Sox || 11 – 9 (10) || Takatsu (4-0) || Jiménez (1-5) || || 27,922 || 34-35
|-align="center" bgcolor="#bbffbb"
| 70 || June 23 || @ White Sox || 9 – 5 || Lee (7-1) || Buehrle (7-2) || || 21,654 || 35-35
|-align="center" bgcolor="#ffbbbb"
| 71 || June 24 || @ White Sox || 7 – 1 || Rauch (1-1) || Westbrook (6-4) || || 20,744 || 35-36
|-align="center" bgcolor="#ffbbbb"
| 72 || June 25 || Rockies || 10 – 8 (10) || Reed (1-1) || Jiménez (1-6) || Chacón (16) || 22,642 || 35-37
|-align="center" bgcolor="#bbffbb"
| 73 || June 26 || Rockies || 4 – 3 (12) || Robertson (1-0) || Reed (1-2) || || 29,124 || 36-37
|-align="center" bgcolor="#bbffbb"
| 74 || June 27 || Rockies || 5 – 3 || Miller (2-0) || Jennings (6-7) || Jiménez (8) || 27,252 || 37-37
|-align="center" bgcolor="#ffbbbb"
| 75 || June 29 || @ Tigers || 9 – 7 (11) || Dingman (2-1) || Jiménez (1-7) || || 30,457 || 37-38
|-align="center" bgcolor="#ffbbbb"
| 76 || June 30 || @ Tigers || 12 – 5 || Robertson (7-3) || Davis (2-6) || || 27,665 || 37-39
|-

|-align="center" bgcolor="#bbffbb"
| 77 || July 1 || @ Tigers || 7 – 6 (10) || Riske (4-2) || Urbina (3-3) || White (1) || 25,159 || 38-39
|-align="center" bgcolor="#bbffbb"
| 78 || July 2 || @ Reds || 15 – 2 || Tadano (1-0) || Sánchez (0-1) || || 36,156 || 39-39
|-align="center" bgcolor="#ffbbbb"
| 79 || July 3 || @ Reds || 4 – 2 || Wilson (8-2) || Elarton (0-1) || Graves (31) || 38,708 || 39-40
|-align="center" bgcolor="#ffbbbb"
| 80 || July 4 || @ Reds || 5 – 4 (11) || Jones (6-2) || White (3-3) || || 30,375 || 39-41
|-align="center" bgcolor="#ffbbbb"
| 81 || July 5 || Rangers || 8 – 5 || Rogers (12-2) || Sabathia (5-4) || Cordero (25) || 25,363 || 39-42
|-align="center" bgcolor="#bbffbb"
| 82 || July 6 || Rangers || 4 – 1 || Lee (8-1) || Bierbrodt (1-1) || Riske (3) || 16,796 || 40-42
|-align="center" bgcolor="#ffbbbb"
| 83 || July 7 || Rangers || 9 – 8 || Mahay (2-0) || Robertson (1-1) || Cordero (26) || 18,499 || 40-43
|-align="center" bgcolor="#ffbbbb"
| 84 || July 8 || Rangers || 10 – 0 || Rodríguez (2-0) || Elarton (0-2) || || 24,914 || 40-44
|-align="center" bgcolor="#bbffbb"
| 85 || July 9 || Athletics || 5 – 4 || Howry (1-0) || Dotel (1-1) || || 24,325 || 41-44
|-align="center" bgcolor="#ffbbbb"
| 86 || July 10 || Athletics || 16 – 7 || Mulder (12-2) || White (3-4) || || 28,448 || 41-45
|-align="center" bgcolor="#bbffbb"
| 87 || July 11 || Athletics || 4 – 1 || Lee (9-1) || Zito (4-7) || Riske (4) || 24,622 || 42-45
|-align="center" bgcolor="#ffbbbb"
| 88 || July 15 || @ Mariners || 2 – 1 || Piñeiro (5-10) || Westbrook (6-5) || Guardado (16) || 32,896 || 42-46
|-align="center" bgcolor="#bbffbb"
| 89 || July 16 || @ Mariners || 18 – 6 || Lee (10-1) || Blackley (1-2) || || 32,578 || 43-46
|-align="center" bgcolor="#bbffbb"
| 90 || July 17 || @ Mariners || 6 – 5 || Sabathia (6-4) || Franklin (3-8) || Riske (5) || 36,154 || 44-46
|-align="center" bgcolor="#ffbbbb"
| 91 || July 18 || @ Mariners || 7 – 5 || Hasegawa (3-3) || Miller (2-1) || Guardado (17) || 37,363 || 44-47
|-align="center" bgcolor="#bbffbb"
| 92 || July 19 || @ Angels || 8 – 5 (10) || Riske (5-2) || Percival (2-2) || Miller (1) || 42,986 || 45-47
|-align="center" bgcolor="#bbffbb"
| 93 || July 20 || @ Angels || 14 – 5 || Westbrook (7-5) || Washburn (10-5) || || 40,000 || 46-47
|-align="center" bgcolor="#ffbbbb"
| 94 || July 21 || White Sox || 14 – 0 || Buehrle (10-3) || Lee (10-2) || || 21,922 || 46-48
|-align="center" bgcolor="#ffbbbb"
| 95 || July 22 || White Sox || 3 – 0 || García (8-8) || Sabathia (6-5) || Takatsu (7) || 23,168 || 46-49
|-align="center" bgcolor="#bbffbb"
| 96 || July 23 || Royals || 3 – 2 (11) || White (4-4) || Field (2-2) || || 26,504 || 47-49
|-align="center" bgcolor="#bbffbb"
| 97 || July 24 || Royals || 10 – 2 || Durbin (4-4) || George (1-2) || || 18,873 || 48-49
|-align="center" bgcolor="#bbffbb"
| 98 || July 24 || Royals || 4 – 3 || Miller (3-1) || Sullivan (3-3) || || 27,865 || 49-49
|-align="center" bgcolor="#bbffbb"
| 99 || July 25 || Royals || 5 – 1 || Westbrook (8-5) || Greinke (2-8) || || 23,540 || 50-49
|-align="center" bgcolor="#ffbbbb"
| 100 || July 26 || Tigers || 13 – 4 || Maroth (8-7) || Lee (10-3) || || 18,359 || 50-50
|-align="center" bgcolor="#bbffbb"
| 101 || July 27 || Tigers || 10 – 6 || Sabathia (7-5) || Knotts (5-6) || || 19,090 || 51-50
|-align="center" bgcolor="#bbffbb"
| 102 || July 28 || Tigers || 5 – 4 || Elarton (1-2) || Walker (1-4) || Wickman (1) || 23,213 || 52-50
|-align="center" bgcolor="#bbffbb"
| 103 || July 30 || @ Royals || 7 – 6 (11) || Betancourt (4-4) || Sullivan (3-4) || || 32,079 || 53-50
|-align="center" bgcolor="#ffbbbb"
| 104 || July 31 || @ Royals || 10 – 3 || Greinke (3-8) || Tadano (1-1) || || 27,689 || 53-51
|-

|-align="center" bgcolor="#ffbbbb"
| 105 || August 1 || @ Royals || 8 – 7 || May (8-11) || Sabathia (7-6) || Camp (2) || 15,641 || 53-52
|-align="center" bgcolor="#ffbbbb"
| 106 || August 2 || @ Blue Jays || 6 – 1 || Lilly (8-7) || Lee (10-4) || || 17,549 || 53-53
|-align="center" bgcolor="#ffbbbb"
| 107 || August 3 || @ Blue Jays || 7 – 6 || Speier (3-6) || Betancourt (4-5) || Frasor (14) || 15,025 || 53-54
|-align="center" bgcolor="#bbffbb"
| 108 || August 4 || @ Blue Jays || 14 – 5 || Westbrook (9-5) || Towers (6-4) || || 15,675 || 54-54
|-align="center" bgcolor="#bbffbb"
| 109 || August 5 || @ Blue Jays || 6 – 3 (10) || Betancourt (5-5) || Ligtenberg (1-4) || Wickman (2) || 30,037 || 55-54
|-align="center" bgcolor="#bbffbb"
| 110 || August 6 || @ White Sox || 3 – 2 || Sabathia (8-6) || Buehrle (10-5) || Wickman (3) || 23,811 || 56-54
|-align="center" bgcolor="#bbffbb"
| 111 || August 7 || @ White Sox || 6 – 5 || Miller (4-1) || Takatsu (4-3) || Wickman (4) || 32,790 || 57-54
|-align="center" bgcolor="#ffbbbb"
| 112 || August 8 || @ White Sox || 3 – 2 || Takatsu (5-3) || Betancourt (5-6) || || 25,897 || 57-55
|-align="center" bgcolor="#bbffbb"
| 113 || August 9 || @ White Sox || 13 – 11 || Westbrook (10-5) || Díaz (1-3) || || 31,116 || 58-55
|-align="center" bgcolor="#bbffbb"
| 114 || August 10 || Blue Jays || 2 – 0 || Durbin (5-4) || Bush (1-3) || Wickman (5) || 19,942 || 59-55
|-align="center" bgcolor="#bbffbb"
| 115 || August 11 || Blue Jays || 3 – 2 || Sabathia (9-6) || Frederick (0-1) || Wickman (6) || 23,696 || 60-55
|-align="center" bgcolor="#bbffbb"
| 116 || August 12 || Blue Jays || 6 – 2 || Riske (6-2) || Ligtenberg (1-5) || || 22,734 || 61-55
|-align="center" bgcolor="#bbffbb"
| 117 || August 13 || Twins || 8 – 2 || Elarton (2-2) || Silva (10-8) || || 30,101 || 62-55
|-align="center" bgcolor="#bbffbb"
| 118 || August 14 || Twins || 7 – 1 || Westbrook (11-5) || Lohse (5-10) || || 40,942 || 63-55
|-align="center" bgcolor="#ffbbbb"
| 119 || August 15 || Twins || 4 – 2 (10) || Rincón (10-5) || White (4-5) || Nathan (34) || 38,019 || 63-56
|-align="center" bgcolor="#ffbbbb"
| 120 || August 16 || @ Rangers || 5 – 2 || Ramirez (4-3) || Sabathia (9-7) || Cordero (36) || 23,551 || 63-57
|-align="center" bgcolor="#ffbbbb"
| 121 || August 17 || @ Rangers || 16 – 4 || Erickson (1-2) || Lee (10-5) || Brocail (1) || 24,864 || 63-58
|-align="center" bgcolor="#ffbbbb"
| 122 || August 18 || @ Rangers || 5 – 2 || Rogers (15-5) || Elarton (2-3) || Cordero (37) || 31,572 || 63-59
|-align="center" bgcolor="#ffbbbb"
| 123 || August 20 || @ Twins || 5 – 1 || Lohse (6-10) || Westbrook (11-6) || || 25,157 || 63-60
|-align="center" bgcolor="#ffbbbb"
| 124 || August 21 || @ Twins || 8 – 1 || Mulholland (4-6) || Durbin (5-5) || || 27,945 || 63-61
|-align="center" bgcolor="#ffbbbb"
| 125 || August 22 || @ Twins || 7 – 3 || Radke (9-6) || Sabathia (9-8) || || 28,587 || 63-62
|-align="center" bgcolor="#ffbbbb"
| 126 || August 23 || Yankees || 6 – 4 || Gordon (5-3) || Wickman (0-1) || Rivera (42) || 33,172 || 63-63
|-align="center" bgcolor="#ffbbbb"
| 127 || August 24 || Yankees || 5 – 4 || Gordon (6-3) || Wickman (0-2) || Rivera (43) || 31,729 || 63-64
|-align="center" bgcolor="#bbffbb"
| 128 || August 25 || Yankees || 4 – 3 || Riske (7-2) || Gordon (6-4) || Betancourt (3) || 30,605 || 64-64
|-align="center" bgcolor="#ffbbbb"
| 129 || August 26 || White Sox || 14 – 9 || Cotts (2-3) || Durbin (5-6) || || 30,049 || 64-65
|-align="center" bgcolor="#bbffbb"
| 130 || August 27 || White Sox || 6 – 3 || Sabathia (10-8) || Grilli (0-1) || Wickman (7) || 30,527 || 65-65
|-align="center" bgcolor="#ffbbbb"
| 131 || August 28 || White Sox || 5 – 3 || Contreras (12-6) || Lee (10-6) || Takatsu (13) || 37,374 || 65-66
|-align="center" bgcolor="#bbffbb"
| 132 || August 29 || White Sox || 9 – 0 || Elarton (3-3) || Garland (9-10) || || 32,834 || 66-66
|-align="center" bgcolor="#bbffbb"
| 133 || August 31 || @ Yankees || 22 – 0 || Westbrook (12-6) || Vázquez (13-8) || || 51,777 || 67-66
|-

|-align="center" bgcolor="#ffbbbb"
| 134 || September 1 || @ Yankees || 5 – 3 || Hernández (6-0) || Sabathia (10-9) || Rivera (46) || 41,448 || 67-67
|-align="center" bgcolor="#ffbbbb"
| 135 || September 2 || @ Yankees || 9 – 1 || Lieber (10-8) || Lee (10-7) || || 37,963 || 67-68
|-align="center" bgcolor="#ffbbbb"
| 136 || September 3 || Angels || 10 – 5 || Escobar (9-9) || Elarton (3-4) || || 20,994 || 67-69
|-align="center" bgcolor="#ffbbbb"
| 137 || September 4 || Angels || 6 – 1 || Washburn (11-5) || Davis (2-7) || || 23,786 || 67-70
|-align="center" bgcolor="#ffbbbb"
| 138 || September 5 || Angels || 2 – 1 || Lackey (12-11) || Westbrook (12-7) || Rodríguez (11) || 26,208 || 67-71
|-align="center" bgcolor="#bbffbb"
| 139 || September 6 || @ Mariners || 5 – 0 || Sabathia (11-9) || Meche (4-6) || || 33,084 || 68-71
|-align="center" bgcolor="#bbffbb"
| 140 || September 8 || @ Mariners || 9 – 5 || Lee (11-7) || Baek (1-2) || || 28,764 || 69-71
|-align="center" bgcolor="#bbffbb"
| 141 || September 10 || @ Athletics || 4 – 3 (12) || White (5-5) || Duchscherer (5-6) || Wickman (8) || 24,154 || 70-71
|-align="center" bgcolor="#ffbbbb"
| 142 || September 11 || @ Athletics || 5 – 4 || Rincón (1-0) || Howry (1-1) || Dotel (19) || 30,436 || 70-72
|-align="center" bgcolor="#ffbbbb"
| 143 || September 12 || @ Athletics || 1 – 0 || Zito (11-10) || Westbrook (12-8) || Dotel (20) || 29,107 || 70-73
|-align="center" bgcolor="#ffbbbb"
| 144 || September 14 || Tigers || 11 – 3 || Bonderman (10-11) || Denney (0-1) || || 16,489 || 70-74
|-align="center" bgcolor="#bbffbb"
| 145 || September 15 || Tigers || 5 – 3 || Howry (2-1) || Yan (2-4) || Wickman (9) || 15,411 || 71-74
|-align="center" bgcolor="#ffbbbb"
| 146 || September 16 || Tigers || 6 – 4 || Walker (3-4) || Sabathia (11-10) || Yan (4) || 15,943 || 71-75
|-align="center" bgcolor="#ffbbbb"
| 147 || September 17 || Royals || 6 – 4 || Wood (3-7) || Westbrook (12-9) || Affeldt (11) || 14,347 || 71-76
|-align="center" bgcolor="#ffbbbb"
| 148 || September 18 || Royals || 7 – 1 || Gobble (8-8) || Lee (11-8) || || 17,848 || 71-77
|-align="center" bgcolor="#bbffbb"
| 149 || September 19 || Royals || 8 – 3 || Denney (1-1) || Bautista (0-3) || || 16,745 || 72-77
|-align="center" bgcolor="#ffbbbb"
| 150 || September 20 || @ Tigers || 3 – 1 || Maroth (11-11) || Elarton (3-5) || Yan (5) || 13,820 || 72-78
|-align="center" bgcolor="#bbffbb"
| 151 || September 21 || @ Tigers || 8 – 7 || Howry (3-1) || Yan (3-5) || Wickman (10) || 11,351 || 73-78
|-align="center" bgcolor="#bbffbb"
| 152 || September 22 || @ Tigers || 7 – 6 || Westbrook (13-9) || Ledezma (4-3) || || 16,360 || 74-78
|-align="center" bgcolor="#bbffbb"
| 153 || September 23 || Twins || 9 – 7 || Lee (12-8) || Durbin (0-1) || Betancourt (4) || 18,053 || 75-78
|-align="center" bgcolor="#ffbbbb"
| 154 || September 24 || Twins || 8 – 2 || Santana (20-6) || Denney (1-2) || || 16,253 || 75-79
|-align="center" bgcolor="#bbffbb"
| 155 || September 25 || Twins || 5 – 3 || Howry (4-1) || Romero (7-3) || Wickman (11) || 23,541 || 76-79
|-align="center" bgcolor="#ffbbbb"
| 156 || September 26 || Twins || 6 – 2 || Silva (14-8) || Cruceta (0-1) || || 22,091 || 76-80
|-align="center" bgcolor="#bbffbb"
| 157 || September 27 || @ Royals || 6 – 1 || Westbrook (14-9) || Cerda (1-3) || || 11,544 || 77-80
|-align="center" bgcolor="#bbffbb"
| 158 || September 28 || @ Royals || 5 – 1 || Lee (13-8) || May (9-19) || || 11,847 || 78-80
|-align="center" bgcolor="#bbffbb"
| 159 || September 29 || @ Royals || 5 – 2 || Bartosh (1-0) || Wood (3-8) || Wickman (12) || 11,193 || 79-80
|-

|-align="center" bgcolor="#ffbbbb"
| 160 || October 1 || @ Twins || 4 – 3 || Crain (3-0) || Howry (4-2) || Nathan (44) || 25,322 || 79-81
|-align="center" bgcolor="#ffbbbb"
| 161 || October 2 || @ Twins || 6 – 5 (12) || Lohse (9-12) || Riske (7-3) || || 32,268 || 79-82
|-align="center" bgcolor="#bbffbb"
| 162 || October 3 || @ Twins || 5 – 2 || Lee (14-8) || Lohse (9-13) || Wickman (13) || 28,624 || 80-82
|-

Player stats

Batting
Note: G = Games played; AB = At bats; R = Runs scored; H = Hits; 2B = Doubles; 3B = Triples; HR = Home runs; RBI = Runs batted in; AVG = Batting average; SB = Stolen bases

Pitching
Note: W = Wins; L = Losses; ERA = Earned run average; G = Games pitched; GS = Games started; SV = Saves; IP = Innings pitched; H = Hits allowed; R = Runs allowed; ER = Earned runs allowed; BB = Walks allowed; K = Strikeouts

Awards and honors

All-Star Game

Minor league affiliates

Notes

References 
2004 Cleveland Indians at Baseball Reference
2004 Cleveland Indians at Baseball Almanac

Cleveland Guardians seasons
Cleveland Indians season
Cleve